"We're an American Band" is a song by American rock band Grand Funk Railroad, released in 1973 from the band's seventh album of the same name, which became the band's first number one single, released July 2, 1973. Written by Don Brewer and produced by Todd Rundgren, its huge chart success broadened Grand Funk's appeal. It was sung by drummer Don Brewer who began doing more lead vocals for the band and helped with their transition to making top 40 hits.

It is the 99th song on VH1's list of the 100 Greatest Hard Rock Songs.

Lyrics
Brewer's lyrics are somewhat autobiographical, detailing the band's recent tour and their energetic live performances. In the song, Brewer mentions playing poker with blues great Freddie King, traveling through Little Rock, Arkansas, as well as stopping to party with four groupies who snuck into their hotel in Omaha, Nebraska. The lyrics also mention "sweet sweet Connie", in reference to the legendary Arkansas groupie Connie Hamzy.

According to rock critic/writer Dave Marsh in his book, The Heart of Rock and Soul, Grand Funk was touring with the British group Humble Pie in early 1973. After one performance, the two groups were drinking in a bar when they began arguing over the merits of British versus American rock. Grand Funk drummer Don Brewer stood up and after bragging about American rock heroes such as Jerry Lee Lewis, Fats Domino, Little Richard, and Elvis Presley, proudly announced, "We're an American band!" Thus inspired, he wrote the song the next morning; by late 1973, it was the top-selling song in the world. Brewer says "it never happened". "We were good friends with the guys in Humble Pie and even asked guitarist Peter Frampton to join our band". Don says the song was written during the terrible period when their former manager Terry Knight was suing them and trying to keep them from touring as Grand Funk. The band desperately needed a hit record and Brewer came up with the song.  A video was also made, showing the band playing the song as well as engaging in activities such as basketball, dirtbike riding, and watersports.

The original single was released on gold transparent vinyl.

Reception
Cash Box said that the "group comes through with powerful, chunky rhythms and meaningful lyrics."

Charts

Weekly charts

Year-end charts

Subsequent versions 

The band Americade covered it for their 1982 album release American Metal and the corresponding video won "Best New Video" (one of six nominated summer rock videos) on MTV (July 3 and 4, 1983---announced by Lindsay Buckingham and VJ Alan Hunter).
The German band Spider Murphy Gang published a musically identical German (Bavarian) version as a single in 1983. The song was also featured on their 1983 album Live! as well as on their Greatest Hits (1986).
Electronic rocker Nash the Slash recorded it as the implied title track of his 1984 album, American Band-ages, which consisted of cover versions of classic rock songs—also issued it as a single. It begins with a 1950s jazz-pop arrangement of the theme song from American Bandstand with a pop vocal group singing the chorus lyrics of "We're an American Band" to that tune, before it abruptly turns into a full electronic rock version of the Grand Funk song. Since Nash plays all the instruments on his records, the lyrics are changed to: "I'm an American band, I come into your town, I'm gonna burn it down." (Nash was Canadian.)
Autograph covered it in November 1985 and had it added to their second album That's the Stuff in early 1986, replacing track No. 6 in the original October 1985 release. The "Up all night with Freddie King, I got to tell you poker's his thing" portion early in the song is replaced by "Up all night, sleep all day, I got to tell you that's how we play" for unknown reasons, possibly because of King's death ten years earlier.
The band Blotto recorded a live version of the song with the lyrics altered to fit their own circumstances (including a reference to their home town of Albany, New York) which appeared on their 2000 CD Then More Than Ever.
The band Dain Bramage, which featured Dave Grohl, covered the song on their second demo tape in 1986.
The hardcore punk band Verbal Abuse covered it on their Just an American Band LP in 1983.
Accordion-based rock band Those Darn Accordions parodied it on their album Squeeze This! (1994) as "We're an Accordion Band", substituting many of the lyrics with references to famous accordion players such as Myron Floren and Flaco "The King" Jiménez. They replace "We'll help you party it down" with "We'll help you polka down".
Jackyl covered it for their 1998 compilation release Choice Cuts, utilizing Jesse Dupree's unique vocal style.
Kid Rock covered it during the Grammy Awards in 2000, substituting "We'll help you party it down" with "We'll take your panties down".
Poison (who also recorded for Capitol) covered it and released it as a single with a music video for their The Best of Poison: 20 Years of Rock (2006) compilation which peaked at No. 17 on the Billboard 200. It was slightly changed, replacing the line "And we proceeded to tear that hotel down" with the line "And Poison tore that hotel down". It was also on the Poison cover album Poison'd (2007).
Singers Aly & AJ have covered it for Randy Jackson's Music Club, Vol. 1 (2008).
The country trio Rascal Flatts used this song to close out their Farmers Insurance presents Changed Tour 2012-2013 every night with the help of their opening acts Little Big Town, Eli Young Band, Edens Edge, The Band Perry, and Kristen Kelly.
Rob Zombie covered it for his 2013 album, Venomous Rat Regeneration Vendor.  In this version, the reference to Freddie King is changed to refer to Slayer guitarist Kerry King.
The Village People and Phish cover it as part of their live repertoire.
Greensky Bluegrass has covered the song on occasion in live performances.

Certifications

References

External links
 "We're an American Band" by Grand Funk Songfacts

1973 songs
1973 singles
2006 singles
Grand Funk Railroad songs
Song recordings produced by Todd Rundgren
Billboard Hot 100 number-one singles
Cashbox number-one singles
Capitol Records singles